Non-surgical mask may refer to:
 Cloth face masks 
 other non-medical masks
 using a surgical mask for non-surgical reasons.